Ahmed Badr (احمد بدر, born 1 May 1977) is an Egyptian male water polo player. He was a member of the Egypt men's national water polo team at the 2004 Summer Olympics. At the club level, he has played for Al Ahly SC.

References

1977 births
Living people
Egyptian male water polo players
Water polo players at the 2004 Summer Olympics
Olympic water polo players of Egypt
Place of birth missing (living people)
21st-century Egyptian people